Paopi 4 - Coptic Calendar - Paopi 6

The fifth day of the Coptic month of Paopi, the second month of the Coptic year. On a common year, this day corresponds to October 2, of the Julian Calendar, and October 15, of the Gregorian Calendar. This day falls in the Coptic season of Akhet, the season of inundation.

Commemorations

Saints 

 The martyrdom of Saint Paul the Patriarch of Constantinople 
 The departure of Saint Peter the Bishop of Bahnasa

References 

Days of the Coptic calendar